Rajgir–Danapur MEMU (formerly 53229/53230 Rajgir–Danapur Passenger) is a Mainline Electric Multiple Unit (MEMU) train of the Indian Railways connecting  in Bihar and   in Bihar. It is currently being operated with 63339/63340 train numbers on daily basis.

Service

It averages 24 km/hr as 53229 Rajgir–Danapur Passenger and covers 109 km in 4 hrs 35 mins & 24 km/hr as 53230 Danapur–Rajgir Passenger and covers 109 km in 4 hrs 30 mins.

Route and halts

Traction 

Both trains are hauled by a Diesel Loco Shed, Mughalsarai-based WDM-3A diesel locomotive.

See also 

 Rajgir railway station
 Danapur railway station

References

External links 
53229/Rajgir Danapur Passenger (UnReserved)
53230/Danapur Rajgir Passenger (UnReserved)

Transport in Rajgir
Rail transport in Bihar
Transport in Patna
Electric multiple units of India